Pleasant Valley Township is one of twenty-three townships in Jo Daviess County, Illinois, USA.  As of the 2010 census, its population was 273 and it contained 157 housing units.

Geography

Cemeteries
The township contains Plum River Catholic Cemetery.

Major highways
  Illinois Route 78 north towards Stockton and south towards Mount Carroll.

Demographics

School districts
 Stockton Community Unit School District 206.
 West Carroll Community Unit School District 314.

Political districts
 Illinois's 17th congressional district.
 State House District 89.
 State Senate District 45.

References
 
 United States Census Bureau 2007 TIGER/Line Shapefiles.
 United States National Atlas.

External links
 Jo Daviess County official site.
 City-Data.com.
 Illinois State Archives.
 Township Officials of Illinois.

Townships in Jo Daviess County, Illinois
Townships in Illinois